TCDD E40000 is a series of electric locomotives used by the Turkish State Railways. The batch consisted of 15 units delivered in 1969. The locomotives have a power output of 2,945 kW and are capable of 130 km/h.

External links
 Trains of Turkey on E40000

E40000
25 kV AC locomotives
B-B locomotives
Railway locomotives introduced in 1969
Standard gauge locomotives of Turkey